The 2022 UEFA Europa Conference League Final was the final match of the 2021–22 UEFA Europa Conference League, the first season of Europe's tertiary club football tournament organised by UEFA. It was played on 25 May 2022 at the Arena Kombëtare in Tirana, Albania, between Italian club Roma and Dutch club Feyenoord.

Roma won the match 1–0 to secure the inaugural UEFA Europa Conference League title, the first club from Italy to win a UEFA competition in 12 years. As they had already qualified for the group stage of the 2022–23 UEFA Europa League via their domestic league performance, that competition's access list was rebalanced, with Feyenoord qualifying for the group stage instead of play-off round as the third place in the 2021–22 Eredivisie. If Roma had not qualified for the Champions League or the Europa League through their league performance, they would have received a place in the Europa League group stage instead.

Venue

The match was the first UEFA competition final to be played in Albania. The 21,690-seat Arena Kombëtare is the home stadium of the Albania national team, as well as clubs Dinamo Tirana and Partizani. Construction of the stadium began in 2016 and was completed by November 2019.

Host selection
A bidding process was launched by UEFA to select the venues of the finals of the UEFA Europa Conference League in 2022 and 2023. Associations interested in hosting one of the finals had until 20 February 2020 to submit bid dossiers.

Arena Kombëtare was selected by the UEFA Executive Committee during their meeting on 3 December 2020.

Background

This was Roma's third final in a major UEFA competition, having lost the 1984 European Cup final to Liverpool and the 1991 UEFA Cup final to fellow Italian club Inter Milan, who were the most recent Italian club to reach a European final – losing in the 2020 UEFA Europa League final. Roma was seeking to win their first trophy since the 2007–08 Coppa Italia, and a first European title for an Italian side since Inter won the 2010 UEFA Champions League final. Their head coach José Mourinho, having become the first manager to reach European finals with four different clubs – including the aforementioned 2010 Champions League final, was seeking to become only the third manager – after Udo Lattek and Giovanni Trapattoni – to have won all three existing major European trophies, and the first to achieve the UEFA treble by winning the European Champion Clubs' Cup/UEFA Champions League, UEFA Cup/Europa League, and UEFA Europa Conference League (in place of the now-defunct UEFA Cup Winners' Cup).

This was Feyenoord's fourth final in a major UEFA competition, having won the 1970 European Cup final and both the 1974 and 2002 UEFA Cup finals. The first Dutch club to reach a European final since Ajax lost the 2017 UEFA Europa League final to Mourinho's Manchester United and the most recent to win a European title, they were seeking to join Juventus, Ajax, Bayern Munich, Chelsea and Manchester United as the only clubs to have won all three existing major European trophies, and the first to achieve the UEFA treble by winning the European Champion Clubs' Cup/UEFA Champions League, UEFA Cup/Europa League and UEFA Europa Conference League (again in place of the Cup Winners' Cup). Their head coach Arne Slot was seeking to become the first Dutch to win a European trophy since Dick Advocaat with Zenit Saint Petersburg in the 2008 UEFA Super Cup.

The two sides previously met twice in European competitions, in the 2014–15 UEFA Europa League round of 32, with Roma won one and drew one.

Road to the final

Note: In all results below, the score of the finalist is given first (H: home; A: away).

Pre-match

Identity
The logo of the 2022 UEFA Europa Conference League Final was unveiled at the group stage draw on 27 August 2021 in Istanbul.

Ambassador
The ambassador for the final was former Albanian international Lorik Cana.

Officials

On 11 May 2022, UEFA announced Romanian István Kovács, a FIFA referee since 2010, would officiate the final. Kovács officiated six matches in the 2021–22 Champions League, three matches in the 2021–22 Europa League and one group stage fixture in the 2021–22 Europa Conference League season. He served as a referee at UEFA Euro 2020, where he officiated one group stage match. He also was a referee at the 2014 UEFA European Under-19 Championship, 2019 UEFA European Under-21 Championship and 2019 FIFA U-17 World Cup. He was joined by his fellow countrymen Vasile Marinescu and Ovidiu Artene as assistant referees. Sandro Schärer of Switzerland served as the fourth official, while German Marco Fritz was appointed as the video assistant referee. Fritz's compatriots Christian Dingert and Bastian Dankert served as the assistant and support VAR officials, respectively.

Match

Details
The "home" team (for administrative purposes) was determined by an additional draw held after the quarter-final and semi-final draws.

Statistics

See also
2022 UEFA Champions League Final
2022 UEFA Europa League Final
2022 UEFA Women's Champions League Final
2022 UEFA Super Cup
A.S. Roma in European football
Feyenoord in European football

Notes

References

External links

2022
Final
May 2022 sports events in Albania
Europa Conference League Final 2022
2021–22 in Italian football
Europa Conference League Final 2022
2021–22 in Dutch football
International club association football competitions hosted by Albania
2021–22 in Albanian football
Sports competitions in Tirana